The 1915–16 Dartmouth men's ice hockey season was the 11th season of play for the program.

Season
Dartmouth began their first season under Clarence Wanamaker (class of 1915) well, winning their first three intercollegiate games by shutting out their opponents. The team didn't appear to have lost a step from the squad that had narrowly missed winning a championship the year before, but when they hit the meat of their schedule the team fared poorly.

The Greens lost a close decision to Princeton in mid January then had over three weeks before their next contest. When they played Harvard they were in no shape to face the defending champions and lost badly. They found their legs in the next game against Yale, keeping even with the Elis deep into overtime, but the Bulldogs scored the game winner, relegating Dartmouth to second class status for the year.

The Greens won their final three games, including a route of Army, to finish with a winning record but the mid-season stumble left the team with a sour taste in its mouth.

Note: Dartmouth College did not possess a moniker for its athletic teams until the 1920s, however, the university had adopted 'Dartmouth Green' as its school color in 1866.

Roster

Standings

Schedule and Results

|-
!colspan=12 style=";" | Regular Season

References

Dartmouth Big Green men's ice hockey seasons
Dartmouth
Dartmouth
Dartmouth
Dartmouth